A. Eddy Goldfarb (born Adolph Goldfarb; September 5, 1921) is an American toy inventor. The creator of over 800 toys, he is best known for inventing Yakity Yak Talking Teeth, Battling Tops, KerPlunk, Stompers, and Vac-U-Form.  He is the subject of the award winning short film Eddy's World.

Early life
Adolph Eddy Goldfarb was born in 1921 in Chicago, Illinois, the son of Jewish immigrants from Poland and Romania. He was one of 3 children: Bernard was five years older and Bunny (Bernice) was two years younger.

Even as a young child, he was interested in how things work.  He recalls that when he was around five years old, his father Louis brought home a radio and when it didn't play, he gave it to Goldfarb to take apart to see how it worked. He remembers that it was one of the best toys he ever had.

Louis worked as a tailor in a garment factory and sold goods on a pushcart on Maxwell Street to make extra money. Louis died in 1933 at the young age of 44 and Goldfarb's life changed dramatically. He was 12 years old, and along with his brother and mother Rose, they worked to support the family.

He worked delivering newspapers and groceries. But one of his best jobs was working as a soda jerk for Schuster's Drug Store. And it was there that his friends stopped calling him Adolph (in reaction to Adolf Hitler’s rise to power) and started calling him Eddy. And he became known as Eddy from that point forward.

Goldfarb excelled in math and science in high school, and was interested in studying  physics, but he knew college would have to wait until he could afford the tuition.

A big turning point in Goldfarb's life was World War II. When Pearl Harbor was bombed, Eddy enlisted in the Navy and enrolled in a special program to learn about radar.

The Navy sent him to the University of Houston where he studied electrical engineering and then to a secret lab at Naval Station Treasure Island in San Francisco Bay to specialize in radar.

As a radar technician, Goldfarb volunteered for submarine duty and was assigned to the submarine the USS Batfish. It was still under construction and he was on the first crew to take it out to sea. He was allowed to bring only one sea bag aboard, and he filled it with clothing, books and a spool of magnet wire which he used to build tiny motors. While at sea, he invented a specialized radar antenna.  He also had a sketchbook filled with drawings of his inventions. and he decided that if he wanted to be an independent inventor, he needed to specialize in one industry, and he chose toys.

After the war, Goldfarb returned to Chicago where he met Anita, who he proposed to the day after he met her at a dance, and they were married nine months later. Anita agreed to support him for two years while he pursued his dream to become an independent inventor.

Career as an inventor
His first item he sold was the wild idea of the Yakity Yak Talking Teeth, a simple gag item, which became a cultural icon. He hooked up with promoter Marvin Glass and they brought the Yakity Yak teeth to novelty king Irving Fishlove.  And Goldfarb kept inventing, working day and night, coming up with new ideas, and making the models himself.

In 1949, Goldfarb had 3 toys at the Toy Association's Toy Fair in New York, the toy industry's annual showcase—Yakity Yak Talking Teeth (Fishlove), Busy Biddy Chicken (Topic Toys) and Merry-Go-Sip (Topic Toys). All three toys were really big hits and Goldfarb's career was launched.

Goldfarb always wanted to live in California and in 1952, Goldfarb, Anita and their 2-year-old daughter Lyn moved to Los Angeles. Marvin was angry at him for moving and refused to send Goldfarb any of the royalties owed to him. While California represented a new start, Goldfarb and Anita had a tough time financially.  They moved into a modest home in the San Fernando Valley and Goldfarb set up a model shop in their one car garage. Times were so difficult that when their daughter Fran was born in 1953, Goldfarb didn't have enough money to pay the hospital bill.  He tells the story of how he went to the home of Lew Glaser of Revell Toys that night with a new toy idea and walked out with a check.

By the time their son Martin was born in 1957, Goldfarb's business had grown.  He soon outgrew his shop in the garage, and at the height of his success, Goldfarb owned 3 buildings and employed 39 people - model makers, industrial designers, engineers, sculptors and support staff.

Goldfarb designed a wide range of toys, games, novelties and hobby kits for boys and girls of all ages. He invented more than 800 toys and holds close to 300 patents. Some of his most successful toys were: Yakity Yak Talking Teeth, Battling Tops, Vac-u-form, Arcade Basketball, KerPlunk, Hydro Strike, Giant Bubble Gun, Baby Beans, Stompers, Shark Attack, Numbers Up, Quiz Wiz, Poppin Hoppies, Beware the Spider!, Chutes Away, Marblehead, and Snakes Alive!.  He sold toys to most of the toy companies in the U.S. and then branched out to Europe and Asia.

He had a particularly close working relationship with two of his designers, his associate Del Everitt on Stompers and Rene Soriano on KerPlunk.  In 1998, Goldfarb formed a new partnership with his son Martin (the inventor of Shark Attack). And to this day, Eddy & Martin Goldfarb and Associates are continuing to invent toys and games.

In 2003, Goldfarb was inducted in the Toy Industry Hall of Fame, and in 2010, received the TAGIE (Toy and Game Innovation) Lifetime Achievement Award from the Chicago Toy and Game Group.  He was the first American to receive the I.D.I.O.T. (International Designer and Inventor of Toys) at the UK Toy Inventors’ Dinner at the London Toy Fair in 1993.

In addition to Goldfarb's career inventing toys, he worked with Hank Saperstein to design and manufacture toy premiums for Kelloggs Cereal, and they worked with Elvis Presley to create an Elvis plastic figurine (which was never released).  As part of their collaboration, Anita answered Elvis's fan mail.  Goldfarb also designed spy devices and gadgets for the TV show The Girl from U.N.C.L.E..  In 1985, he was one of first toy inventors to venture into video games (EPYX Barbie and Hot Wheels) but chose not to continue, focusing instead on his passion-designing toys.

Personal life
Goldfarb married Anita Stern in 1947 and they were married for 66 years until her death in 2013. He is now in a relationship with Greta Honigsfeld who also lives in the retirement community. He celebrated his 100th birthday in September 2021.

Eddy has 3 children: Lyn b. 1947, Fran b. 1951, and Martin, b. 1957. He has two grandchildren.

Eddy's sister Bernice Schneider is now 96 years old and lives in Albuquerque, New Mexico.

Inventions
The following is a list of toys, games, and other inventions created by Goldfarb:

The Amazing Spider-Man Web Spinning Action Game (Ideal Toy Company)
Baby Beans (Mattel)
Battling Tops (Ideal Toy Company)
Black Hole in Space (Schaper Toys)
Bright Starters Schoolhouse (Kenner)
Brunswick Air Hockey (Aurora)
Bubble Gun (CAP Toys)
Busy Biddy Chicken (Topic Toys)
Dipsy Diver (Schaper Toys)
Electronic Arcade Basketball (CAP Toys)
Electronic Learning Machine (Coleco)
EPYX Barbie (1984 video game) (Mattel)
EPYX Hot Wheels (video game) (Mattel)
Farbs (Mattel) – invented with Del Everitt
Hydro Strike (Pressman)
KerPlunk (Ideal Toy Company) – invented with Rene Soriano
Koo Koo Clock (Schaper Toys)
Lego Creator: The Race to Build It Board Game (Warren Industries)
Marblehead (Ideal Toy Company)
Milky the Cow (Kenner) – invented with Elonne Dantzer
Melody Madness (GAF View-Master)
Merry Go Sip (Topic Toys)
My First Builder (Warren Industries)
Music Box Kit (Craft Master)
Numbers Up (Milton Bradley)
Penguin Slide Toy (ABC Toys)
Phantom 4 Hover Craft (Schaper Toys)
Poppin Hoppies (Ideal Toy Company)
Professor Nod (Gabriel Toys)
Puff 'n Toot (Schaper Toys)
Quiz Wiz (Coleco)
Roy Rogers Quick Shooter Hat (Ideal Toy Company)
Shark Attack (Milton Bradley) – invented by Martin Goldfarb
Slip Disc (Milton Bradley)
Snakes Alive (Ideal Toy Company)
Spiral Designer (Ravensburger)
Star Trek (Mego Corporation)
Stompers (Schaper Toys) – invented with Del Everitt
Vac-U-Form (Mattel)
Yakity-Yak Talking Teeth (H. Fishlove & Co.)

Awards and honors
 2003 – Toy Industry Hall of Fame
 2010 – TAGIE (Toy and Game Innovation) Lifetime Achievement Award
 I.D.I.O.T. (International Designer and Inventor of Toys)

References

Sources

External links
 Eddy's World documentary

1921 births
Living people
American centenarians
Men centenarians
Toy inventors
Toy designers
20th-century American inventors
United States Navy personnel of World War II
United States Navy sailors
Jewish American inventors
Jewish American artists
Businesspeople from Chicago
Military personnel from Illinois
American people of Polish-Jewish descent
American people of Romanian-Jewish descent
21st-century American Jews